Aumale, formerly known as Albemarle, is a commune in the Seine-Maritime department in the Normandy region in north-western France. It lies on the River Bresle.

History

The town's Latin name was Alba Marla. It was raised by William the Bastard into a county, for his half-sister, Adelaide of Normandy. It was then held by various Norman and English nobles until its confiscation in 1196 by Philip II of France. Thereafter it was held by the houses of Dammartin, Castile, Harcourt, and Lorraine. In 1547, it was raised to the status of a duchy for Francis of Lorraine. It passed to the house of Savoy, from whom Louis XIV purchased the title in 1675 in order to bestow it upon one of his bastards as an appanage. In 1769, it passed to the House of Orléans. The English Earls of Albemarle, meanwhile, also derive their name from the area.

During World War II, the town was occupied by Germany. The SS operated a subcamp of the V SS construction brigade, in which over 500 men, mostly Poles and Soviets, worked as slave labour on the construction of facilities for the V-1 flying bombs. The prisoners tried to resist the Germans, and several were murdered for sabotaging the rockets or escape attempts. In August 1944, due to Allied advance, the Germans dissolved the subcamp and deported its prisoners to subcamps of the Mittelbau-Dora concentration camp.

Geography
A village of farming and associated light industry, situated in the valley of the Bresle of the Norman Pays de Bray in Normandy on the border with Picardy. The A29 autoroute (Saint-Quentin-Beuzeville) passes through the commune's northern sector. Aumale station, on the Beauvais – Le Tréport-Mers railway line, is served by local TER trains.

Heraldry

Population

Places of interest
 The church of Saints Peter and Paul, dating from the sixteenth century.
 The sixteenth-century Hôtel de ville (town hall).
 A seventeenth-century Hospital.
 The chapel of Our Lady of the Cardonnoy, dating from the thirteenth century.
 The seventeenth-century château du Bois Robin
 The tower and buildings of the 16th-century abbey.

Twin towns
  Csurgó, Hungary, since 1991
  Cuckfield, England, since 1991

Gallery

See also
 Communes of the Seine-Maritime department
 Counts and Dukes of Aumale

References

External links

Aumale official website 

Communes of Seine-Maritime